"The Sun" is a song by Greek singer Demy and Alex Leon featuring Epsilon. It was released as a digital download in Greece on 15 May 2013 as the lead single from her second studio album Rodino Oneiro (2014). The song peaked at number 1 on the Greek Singles Chart.

Music video
A music video to accompany the release of "The Sun" was first released onto YouTube on 16 May 2013 at a total length of three minutes and thirty-eight seconds.

Track listing

Charts

Release history

References

2013 songs
2013 singles
Song articles with missing songwriters